Save the Cinema is a British drama film written by Piers Ashworth and directed by Sara Sugarman, based on the true story of Liz Evans, a hairdresser and leader of a youth theatre in Carmarthen, Wales, who began a campaign in 1993 to save the Lyric cinema from closure. The film stars Jonathan Pryce, Samantha Morton, Tom Felton, Adeel Akhtar and Susan Wokoma.

Liz Evans was the mother of Wynne Evans, a principal of the Welsh National Opera who, since 2009, has appeared as a fictional Italian tenor called Gio Compario in the advertising campaign for GoCompare; and Mark Llewellyn Evans, a member of the English National Opera and founder of ABC of Opera.  They both appear in the film in cameo roles.

Plot
Liz Evans is a hairdresser and leader of a youth theatre in Carmarthen, Wales, who started a campaign in 1993 to save the Lyric cinema from closure. She and a local councilor will enlist the help of Steven Spielberg, securing a special premiere for Jurassic Park.

Cast

Production
Filming began in January 2021, under strict health protocols due to the COVID-19 pandemic. Filming took place around Carmarthenshire, Wales. Locations included the Lyric cinema, Ammanford town hall, and the towns Laugharne and Llandeilo.

Release
Save the Cinema was released in the United Kingdom on 14 January 2022. The film earned $12,864 from 40 cinemas in its opening weekend.

References

External links
 

2022 films
2022 drama films
British drama films
2020s English-language films
2020s British films